Dame Meg Taylor  is a Papua New Guinean politician who served as Secretary General to the Pacific Islands Forum from 2014 to 2021. She was previously an athlete, lawyer and diplomat.

Life and career
She received her LL.B degree from Melbourne University, Australia, and her LL.M degree from Harvard University in the United States. She practiced law in Papua New Guinea and serves as a member of the Law Reform Commission.

The daughter of Australian explorer Jim Taylor, she was made a Dame Commander of the Order of the British Empire in 2002.

From 1989 to 1994, she was Ambassador of Papua New Guinea to the United States, Mexico and Canada in Washington D.C. Until 2014, Taylor was vice president, Compliance Advisor Ombudsman (CAO) for the International Finance Corporation (IFC) and the Multilateral Investment Guarantee Agency (MIGA) of the World Bank Group.

On 31 July 2014, it was announced that Dame Meg Taylor would take up the appointment of Secretary General to the Pacific Islands Forum, an intergovernmental organization that aims to enhance cooperation between the independent countries of the Pacific Ocean; she became the first woman to hold that post.

Achievements in athletics

See also 
List of first women lawyers and judges in Oceania

References

External links
 CAO
 Transparency Papua New Guinea

Place of birth missing (living people)
1951 births
Living people
Secretaries General of the Pacific Islands Forum
Ambassadors of Papua New Guinea to the United States
Ambassadors of Papua New Guinea to Mexico
High Commissioners of Papua New Guinea to Canada
Dames Commander of the Order of the British Empire
Papua New Guinean lawyers
Papua New Guinean women diplomats
Papua New Guinean female sprinters
Harvard Law School alumni
Women ambassadors
Melbourne Law School alumni
Papua New Guinean people of Australian descent